Calamba, officially the Municipality of Calamba, is a 4th class municipality in the province of Misamis Occidental, Philippines. According to the 2020 census, it has a population of 23,227 people.

Geography

Barangays
Calamba is politically subdivided into 19 barangays.
 Bonifacio
 Bunawan
 Calaran
 Dapacan Alto
 Dapacan Bajo
 Langub
 Libertad
 Magcamiguing
 Mamalad
 Mauswagon
 Northern Poblacion
 Salvador
 San Isidro
 Siloy
 Singalat
 Solinog
 Southwestern Poblacion
 Sulipat
 Don Bernardo A. Neri (Poblacion)
 Dennis de los Santos

Climate

Demographics

Education

 Calamba Central School
 Calamba National Comprehensive High School
 Liberation Institute
 Sacred Heart College
 CCIT or College of Communication, Information & Technology

References

External links
 [ Philippine Standard Geographic Code]
Philippine Census Information
Local Governance Performance Management System

Municipalities of Misamis Occidental